Kaludiya Pokuna Archeological Forest Site (කළුදිය පොකුණ පුරාවිද්‍යා භූමිය), is a forest with archeological remains in Kandalama, in the Dry Zone of Sri Lanka. The site has been handed over to the Girls' High School, Kandy in accordance with the "Urumaya Thani Nokaramu" program organized by the Department of Archeology. For the first time in Sri Lanka, a school was given custody of an archeological site.

Etymology

The place got its name from a pond that had dark water at ancient times.

Archeological remains 

The site was initially settled in the 2nd century BC. The remains in the site include inscriptions, residences and a monastery.

Species diversity
Kaludiya Pokuna is also rich with numerous biodiversity, both flora and fauna. The forest is home for many endemic and non-endemic species of flora and fauna, that prevail much more secure than other forests in Sri Lanka.

Site is surrounded by farmland and human settlements from the north, east, and west but is undisturbed by humans and the primates are not provisioned. There is no evidence to indicate that hunting, timber extraction, or woodcutting have occurred at the site.

Forest is composed of many endemic and highly valuable trees and shrubs. The majority of flora are in the family Euphorbiaceae.
Plants like Hydnocarpus venenata, Mischodon zeylanicus, Lepisanthes senegalensis, Grewia rothii, Ficus microcarpa, Mussaenda frondosa, Drypetes sepiaria, Mallotus eriocarpus, Manilkara hexandra, Dimocarpus longan, and Tetrameles nudiflora are abundant. Plants of family Ebenaceae, such as Diospyros ebenum, Diospyros malabarica, Diospyros oocarpa, and Diospyros ovalifolia, which has large timber value, are enormous without any human conflict.

Kaludiya Pokuna is rich with its populations of primate species mainly, where many researches on primates based on this site, especially on tufted gray langur and purple-faced langur. Besides them, forest is also home for the other primates in Sri Lanka, such as toque macaque and red slender loris and other herbivorous mammals, such as Asian elephants (Elephas maximus), spotted deer (Axis axis), sambar (Rusa unicolor), and wild boar (Sus scrofa). The area is also home to a full complement of potential predators such as black eagles (Ictinaetus malaiensis), crested serpent eagles (Spilornis cheela), brahminy kites (Haliastur indus), white-bellied sea eagles (Haliaeetus leucogaster), leopards (Panthera pardus), fishing cats (Prionailurus viverrinus) and Indian rock pythons (Python molurus).

Endemic snakes such as Sri Lanka flying snake, Boiga barnesii, Dendrelaphis bifrenalis, Dendrelaphis oliveri, Oligodon sublineatus are frequently seen. Venomous snakes like Indian cobra, Russell's viper and Hypnale hypnale. Numerous types of skinks and lizards are also found.

The avian diversity is much more high than all other faunal categories at Kaludiya Pokuna. It is about 120 species of birds paradise. Most common birds are Indian cormorant, Oriental darter, Indian pond heron, cattle egret, black-headed ibis and common peafowl.

Endemic birds like Sri Lanka spurfowl, Sri Lanka junglefowl, Sri Lanka grey hornbill, brown-capped babbler, Sri Lanka green pigeon, crimson-fronted barbet, greater flameback, greater racket-tailed drongo, black-capped bulbul can be seen without disturbances. It means out of 33 endemic species, 80% of endemic birds are found in Kaludiya Pokuna.

Both types of monitor lizards - Bengal monitor and water monitor, can be seen in Kaludiya Pokuna.

Butterflies and moths are also frequent in Kaludiya Pokuna. Species like crimson rose, common Mormon, Ceylon rose, common rose, common cerulean, common Indian crow, Lemon emigrant are common.

The following list provide the fauna of Kaludiya Pokuna Archeological Forest Reserve.

Birds

Aquatic birds around lakes in Kaludiya Pokuna

 Spot-billed pelican Pelecanus philippensis
 Little cormorant Microcarbo niger
 Indian cormorant Phalacrocorax fuscicollis
 Greater cormorant Phalacrocorax carbo
 Indian darter Anhinga melanogaster
 Little egret Egretta garzetta
 Great egret Ardea alba
 Gray heron Ardea cinerea
 Purple heron Ardea purpurea
 Cattle egret Bubulcus ibis
 Indian pond heron Ardeola grayii
 Intermediate egret Mesophoyx intermedia
 Eurasian openbill Anastomus oscitans
 Lesser adjutant Leptoptilos javanicus
 Black-headed ibis Threskiornis melanocephalus
 Eurasian spoonbill Platalea leucorodia
 Lesser whistling duck Dendrocygna javanica
 White-breasted waterhen Amaurornis phoenicurus
 Purple coot Porphyrio porphyrio
 Pheassant-tailed jacana Hydrophasianus chirurgus
 Yellow-wattled lapwing Vanellus indicus
 Whiskered tern Chlidonias hybrida
 Strok-billed kingfisher Pelargopsis capensis
 White-throated kingfisher Halcyon smyrnensis

Forest birds in Kaludiya Pokuna Forest

 Jerdon's baza Aviceda jerdoni
 Oriental honey buzzard Pernis ptilorhynchus
 Brahminy kite Haliastur indus
 White-bellied sea eagle Haliaeetus leucogaster
 Gray-headed fishing eagle Ichthyophaga ichthyaetus
 Crested serpent eagle Spilornis cheela
 Shikra Accipiter badius
 Black eagle Ictinaetus malaiensis
 Changeable hawk eagle Nisaetus cirrhatus
 Shaheen falcon Falco peregrinus peregrinator
 Blue-breasted quail Coturnix chinensis
 Sri Lanka spur fowl Galloperdix bicalcarata - endemic
 Sri Lanka jungle fowl Gallus lafayetii - endemic
 Indian peafowl Pavo cristatus
 Emerald dove Chalcophaps indica
 Sri Lanka green pigeon Treron pompadora
 Green imperial pigeon Ducula aenea
 Spotted dove Spilopelia chinensis
 Alexandrine parakeet Psittacula eupatria
 Rose-ringed parakeet Psittacula krameri
 Blue-faced malkoha Phaenicophaeus viridirostris
 Asian koel Eudynamys scolopaceus
 Greater coucal Centropus sinensis
 Oriental scops owl Otus sunia
 Collared scops owl Otus bakkamoena
 Forest eagle owl Bubo nipalensis
 Jerdon's nightjar Caprimulgus atripennis
 Indian swiftlet Aerodramus unicolor
 Asian palm swift Cypsiurus balasiensis
 Little swift Apus affinis
 Little green bee-eater Merops orientalis
 Blue-tailed bee-eater Merops philippinus
 Chestnut-headed bee-eater Merops leschenaulti
 Indian roller Coracias benghalensis
 Malabar pied hornbill Anthracoceros coronatus
 Sri Lanka gray hornbill Ocyceros gingalensis - endemic
 Brown-headed barbet Megalaima zeylanica
 Crimson-fronted barbet Megalaima rubricapillus - endemic
 Coppersmith barbet Megalaima haemacephala
 Golden-backed woodpecker Dinopium benghalense
 Greater flameback Chrysocolaptes stricklandi - endemic
 Indian pitta Pitta brachyura Barn swallow Hirundo rustica Red-rumped swallow Hirundo hyperythra - endemic
 Paddyfield pipit Anthus rufulus Flame minivet Pericrocotus flammeus Sri Lanka woodshrike Tephrodornis affinis - endemic
 Indian paradise flycatcher Terpsiphone paradisi Black-naped monarch Hypothymis azurea White-browed fantail Rhipidura aureola Black-capped bulbul Pycnonotus melanicterus - endemic
 Red-venter bulbul Pycnonotus cafer White-browed bulbul Pycnonotus luteolus Black bulbul Hypsipetes ganeesa Common iora Aegithina tiphia Golden-fronted leafbird Chloropsis aurifrons Jerdon's leafbird Chloropsis jerdoni Asian brown flycatcher Muscicapa latirostris Kashmir flycatcher Ficedula subrubra Tickell's blue flycatcher Cyornis tickelliae Oriental magpie robin Copsychus saularis White-rumped shama Copsychus malabaricus Black-backed robin Saxicoloides fulicatus Brown-capped babbler Pellorneum fuscocapillus Yellow-billed babbler Turdoides affinis Gray-breasted prinia Prinia hodgsonii Ashy prinia Prinia socialis Large prinia Prinia sylvatica Common tailorbird Orthotomus sutorius 
 Pale-billed flowerpecker Dicaeum erythrorhynchos Purple-rumped sunbird Leptocoma zeylonica Purple sunbird Cinnyris asiaticus Oriental white-eye Zosterops palpebrosus White-rumped munia Lonchura striata Scaly-breasted munia Lonchura punctulata Common mynah Acridotheres tristis Indian golden oriole Oriolus kundoo Black-hooded oriole Oriolus xanthornus Black drongo Dicrurus macrocercus Racket-tailed drongo Dicrurus paradiseus Jungle crow Corvus macrorhynchosReptiles

 Indian rock python Python molurus Green vine snake Ahaetulla nasuta Brown vine snake Ahaetulla pulverulenta Common rough-sided snake Aspidura trachyprocta Barnes' cat snake Boiga barnesii Sri Lanka cat snake Boiga ceylonensis Forsten's cat snake Boiga forsteni Common cat snake Boiga trigonata Sri Lanka flying snake Chrysopelea taprobanica - endemic
 Common bronzeback tree snake Dendrelaphis tristis Green keelback snake Rhabdophis plumbicolor Banded kukri Oligodon arnensis Common rat snake Ptyas mucosa Black-headed snake Sibynophis subpunctatus Checkered keelback water snake Fowlea piscator Indian cobra Naja naja Brahminy blind snake Ramphotyphlops braminus Jan's blind snake Typhlops mirus Phillips' shieldtail Uropeltis phillipsi Russell's viper Daboia russelii Hump-nosed viper Hypnale hypnale Sri Lanka green pit viper Trimeresurus trigonocephalus Common green forest lizard Calotes calotes Painted-lipped lizard Calotes ceylonensis Whistling lizard Calotes liolepis Oriental garden lizard Calotes versicolor Lowland kangaroo lizard Otocryptis nigristigma Fan-throated lizard Sitana ponticeriana Small day gecko Cnemaspis podihuna Blotched ground gecko Geckoella yakhuna Kandian gecko Hemidactylus depressus Bark gecko Hemidactylus leschenaultii Haly's tree skink Dasia haliana Common supple skink Lankascincus fallax Common skink Eutropis carinata Rock skink Eutropis macularia Spotted skink Eutropis madaraszi Sarasin's snake skink Nessia sarasinorum Land monitor Varanus benghalensis Water monitor Varanus salvator Mugger Crocodylus palustris Black turtle Melanochelys trijuga Star tortoise Geochelone elegansMammals

 Asian elephant Elephas maximus Gray slender loris Loris lydekkerianus - ssp.nordicus Tufted gray langur Semnopithecus priam - ssp.thersites Purple-faced leaf monkey Trachypithecus vetulus - ssp.philbricki Toque macaque Macaca sinica - ssp.sinica Grizzled giant squirrel Ratufa macroura - ssp.dandolena Indian palm squirrel Funambulus palmarum 
 Indian gerbil Tatera indica Lesser bandicoot rat Bandicota bengalensis Indian field mouse Mus booduga Black rat Rattus rattus Indian porcupine Hystrix indica Black-naped hare Lepus nigricollis Pygmy shrew Suncus etruscus Fulvous fruit bat Rousettus leschenaultii Indian flying fox Pteropus giganteus Fishing cat Prionailurus viverrinus Jungle cat Felis chaus Golden jackal Canis aureus Common palm civet Paradoxurus hermaphroditus Golden palm civet Paradoxurus zeylonensis Small Indian civet Viverricula indica Indian gray mongoose Urva edwardsii Ruddy mongoose Urva smithii Eurasian otter Lutra lutra Wild boar Sus scrofa Indian muntjac Muntiacus muntjak Spotted deer Axis axis Sambar Rusa unicolor''

References

External links 
 Kaludiya Pokuna at the website of the Department of Archaeology of the Sri Lanka government

Matale District
Geography of Central Province, Sri Lanka
Forests of Sri Lanka
Archaeological protected monuments in Matale District